ARA Ciudad de Zárate (Q-61) is a multi-purpose auxiliary ship of the Argentine Navy based at Puerto Madero. It was formerly USCGC Red Cedar (WLM-688).

References
ARA Official web page 

 

Ships built by the United States Coast Guard Yard
1970 ships
Auxiliary ships of the Argentine Navy
Ciudad de Zarate
Auxiliary tender classes